The men's long jump event at the 1999 European Athletics U23 Championships was held in Göteborg, Sweden, at Ullevi on 1 August 1999.

Medalists

Results

Final
1 August

Participation
According to an unofficial count, 14 athletes from 12 countries participated in the event.

 (1)
 (1)
 (1)
 (1)
 (1)
 (1)
 (1)
 (1)
 (2)
 (1)
 (2)
 (1)

References

Long jump
Long jump at the European Athletics U23 Championships